Belphégor (English title The Mystery of the Louvre) is a 1927 crime novel by French writer Arthur Bernède, about a "phantom" which haunts the Louvre Museum, in reality a masked villain trying to steal a hidden treasure.

It was simultaneously adapted for the silent screen by Bernède as a 220-minute movie serial, directed by Henri Desfontaines and starring René Navarre as Chantecoq, Bernède's fictional detective who captures the phantom with the aid of his daughter Collette, and Elmire Vautier as the villainous Belphégor. The film also featured Lucien Dalsace, Michèle Verly (as Colette) and Genica Messirio. Critic Troy Howarth writes that the plot of both the novel and the film was inspired by earlier French serials such as Fantomas (1913), Les Vampires (1915) and Fritz Lang's Dr. Mabuse, the Gambler (1922).

Adaptations 
Belphégor inspired several other adaptations, including an eponymous 1965 French television series starring Juliette Gréco in the title role (but without Chantecoq) and a 1965 daily comic strip sequel to the TV series drawn by Julio Ribéra which appeared in France-Soir,

Additionally, it was also adapted into a 2001 film starring Sophie Marceau which was the first adaptation to actually be filmed inside the Louvre, and a 2001 French-Canadian animated television series which consisted of 26 episodes.

The 1967 film La Malédiction de Belphégor has nothing to do with Bernède's version and was only made to cash in on the 1965 French television series' popularity.

Editions

1927, J. Tallandier
1929, World Wide Publishing Co., Inc. (English)
2001, Fayard, 
2001, Hachette, 
2012, Black Coat Press, (adapted into English by Jean-Marc Lofficier & Randy Lofficier )

References

External links
The French Wold Newton Universe - Belphegor

1927 French novels
French crime novels
Novels set in Paris
French novels adapted into films
French novels adapted into television shows
Novels adapted into comics
Novels about museums